Catherine Greenhill  is an Australian mathematician known for her research on random graphs, combinatorial enumeration and Markov chains. She is a professor of mathematics in the School of Mathematics and Statistics at the University of New South Wales,
and an editor-in-chief of the Electronic Journal of Combinatorics.

Education and career
Greenhill did her undergraduate studies at the University of Queensland, and remained there for a master's degree, working with Anne Penfold Street there. She earned her Ph.D. in 1996 at the University of Oxford, under the supervision of Peter M. Neumann. Her dissertation was From Multisets to Matrix Groups: Some Algorithms Related to the Exterior Square.

After postdoctoral research with Martin Dyer at the University of Leeds and Nick Wormald at the University of Melbourne, Greenhill joined the University of New South Wales in 2003.
She was promoted to associate professor in 2014, becoming the first female mathematician to earn such a promotion at UNSW.

Recognition
Greenhill was the 2010 winner of the Hall Medal of the Institute of Combinatorics and its Applications.
She was president of the Combinatorial Mathematics Society of Australasia for 2011–2013.
In 2015 the Australian Academy of Science awarded her their Christopher Heyde Medal for distinguished research in the mathematical sciences. She was elected a Fellow of the Australian Academy of Science in 2022.

References

External links

Year of birth missing (living people)
Living people
Australian women mathematicians
Women mathematicians
Graph theorists
University of Queensland alumni
Alumni of the University of Oxford
Academic staff of the University of New South Wales
Fellows of the Australian Academy of Science